Fleur Pellerin (née Kim Jong-sook, born 29 August 1973) is a French businesswoman, former civil servant and Socialist Party politician who served as a French government minister from 2012 to 2016.

Early life
Pellerin was born in 1973 in Seoul, South Korea, where she was abandoned on the streets aged only three or four days old before being rescued by an orphanage; six months later she was adopted by a French family. According to her adoption records she was called Kim Jong-Suk, although it is unclear how she came by that name. Raised by middle-class parents — her father, who has a doctorate in nuclear physics, is a small-business owner — she grew up in two Paris suburbs, Montreuil and Versailles.

Early career
Pellerin graduated from ESSEC business school (Master's degree in Management) while she was just 21. She then graduated from Sciences Po (MPA) before attending the École nationale d'administration (ENA). She joined the French Court of Auditors where she rose to become a high-ranking civil servant. From 2010 to 2012, Pellerin served as president of the 21st Century Club, a French group that promotes diversity in employment.

Political career
Pellerin took charge of society and digital economy issues for Socialist Party candidate François Hollande in his successful 2012 French presidential election campaign.

After Hollande's election, Pellerin was appointed as with responsibility for Small and Medium-sized Enterprises, Innovation and the Digital Economy. In July 2012, she publicly announced her opposition to the sale of massive surveillance technologies causing quite a stir in French political circles since France is one of the biggest sellers of such technology. In November 2013, she implemented the creation of the French Tech label.

Minister of Culture and Communications, 2014–2016
In August 2014, Pellerin was appointed Minister of Culture as part of the first government of Prime Minister Manuel Valls. Shortly after Pellerin was appointed Minister of Culture, the French magazine L’Express reported that she vacationed at the Corsican villa owned by film producer Pascal Breton, raising ethics questions.

In March 2015, Pellerin nominated Serge Lasvignes to head the Centre Pompidou, in a surprise choice to replace Alain Seban. Under her leadership, the French Culture Ministry made a bid in September 2015 to purchase one of a highly coveted pair of Rembrandt portraits from Éric de Rothschild for the Louvre in Paris, offering €80 million, or about $90 million.

As part of a major government reshuffle in early 2016, Pellerin was sacked and replaced by Audrey Azoulay, who at the time served as Hollande’s cultural advisor.

Business career

In August 2016, Pellerin resigned from the French Civil Service to begin a new career in the private sector. She then became the head of Korelya Capital, an investment fund aimed at emerging technologies which benefited from a 100-million euros funding by the South Korean Naver Corporation. She also holds several other positions, including the following: 

 Reworld Media, Independent Member of the Board of Directors (since 2019)
 KLM, Member of the Board of Directors (since 2018)
 Schneider Electric, Member of the Board of Directors (since 2018)

In August 2018, Pellerin was listed by UK-based company Richtopia at number 2 in the list of 100 Most Influential French Entrepreneurs.

Other activities 
 Louvre Endowment Fund, Member of the Board of Directors 
 Institut Montaigne, Member of the Board of Directors

Personal life
Pellerin is married to Laurent Olléon, also an ENA graduate, who works for the Council of State providing legal advice to the French government.

See also
Adoption in France
Korean adoptee

References

External links 
 
 www.culturecommunication.gouv.fr

1973 births
Living people
People from Seoul
French adoptees
South Korean adoptees
ESSEC Business School alumni
Sciences Po alumni
École nationale d'administration alumni
Judges of the Court of Audit (France)
French politicians of Korean descent
South Korean emigrants to France
Commandeurs of the Ordre des Arts et des Lettres
French Ministers of Culture
French businesspeople
21st-century French politicians
21st-century French women politicians
Women government ministers of France
Knights of the Ordre national du Mérite